Pseudoboletus is a genus of fungi in the family Boletaceae. The genus contains two species found in north temperate areas that grow in a parasitic association with species of Scleroderma and Pisolithus.

References

 
Boletaceae
Boletales genera